Rhacophorus annamensis is a species of frog in the family Rhacophoridae found in the Annamite Mountains in Cambodia and Vietnam. Its natural habitats are subtropical or tropical moist lowland forest, subtropical or tropical moist montane forest, and rivers. It is threatened by habitat loss. This frog is usually a light gray color, but can also be brown or a dark red color, and in some cases bright yellow.

References

annamensis
Amphibians of Cambodia
Amphibians of Vietnam
Amphibians described in 1924
Taxonomy articles created by Polbot